Ashleigh Barty was the defending champion, having won the previous edition in 2012, but chose to participate at the 2022 Adelaide International instead. 

Yue Yuan won the title, defeating Paula Ormaechea in the final, 6–3, 6–2.

Seeds

Draw

Finals

Top half

Bottom half

References

External Links
Main Draw

Traralgon International - Singles